William Alfred Owen (1884–1945) was an English footballer who played for Stoke.

Career
Owen was born in Stoke-upon-Trent and played amateur football with North Staffs Normads before joining Stoke in 1909. He played in two matches during the 1909–10 season before returning to amateur football with North Staffs Normads. He then had an unsuccessful spell at Manchester City.

Career statistics

References

English footballers
Stoke City F.C. players
1884 births
1945 deaths
Manchester City F.C. players
Association football wing halves
Footballers from Stoke-on-Trent